Renaixença can refer to:

 The Renaixença, a romantic cultural movement in the Catalan language and culture
 The Catalan review La Renaixença